Deane is an area of Bolton, in Greater Manchester, England.

Historically a part of Lancashire, the parish of Deane was one of eleven parishes within the hundred of Salford and covered roughly half of the present Metropolitan Borough of Bolton. The Church of St Mary on which the parish was centred was in the township of Rumworth.

History

Toponymy
The name Deane derives from the Old English word "denu" - meaning valley. In earlier times Deane was written without the final "e".  The stream running in the valley to the west of the church was named the Kirkbroke - meaning Church Brook. The valley is also referred to as Deane Clough, "clough" being a Northern English word for a ravine or deep valley.

Early church history
Since Anglo-Saxon times there has been a chapel at Deane in the township of Rumworth, the earliest record is from the year 1100. This chapel of ease dedicated to St Mary the Virgin was sometimes referred to as St Mariden i.e. St Mary's, Deane in old documents. Deane chapelry in the ancient parish of Eccles was mentioned in 13th-century deeds and became a parish in its own right in 1541. St Mary's Church, on the site of the original chapel, dates from 1452 replacing an earlier structure, the tower and north door are older than the rest of the building. The church has been altered at various times and was restored in about 1880.

George Marsh
The Protestant martyr, George Marsh, a farmer's son, was born in Deane in 1515. When Edward VI became King in 1547, Marsh's study of the New Testament led to his appointment as a preaching minister. When Edward VI died in 1553, his half-sister Mary I became Queen. She sought to re-establish Roman Catholicism, Marsh became victim to her persecution of the reformers. He appeared before Justice Barton at Smithills Hall accused of preaching false doctrines. Imprisoned at Chester, he refused to deny his beliefs, was tried, convicted, and burnt at the stake on April 24, 1555. A memorial was erected in the churchyard in 1893, it is a Grade II listed structure.

Governance
Lying within the boundaries of the historic county of Lancashire since the early 12th century, Deane was originally the northern half of the ancient parish of Eccles, but in 1541 it became a civil and ecclesiastical parish in its own right. As with many large parishes in the north of England, Deane was divided into the ten townships of Horwich, Halliwell, Heaton, Rumworth (where Deane Parish Church is situated), Westhoughton, Over Hulton, Middle Hulton, Little Hulton, Farnworth and Kearsley. Under provisions of the Poor Relief Act 1662, the ten townships became separate autonomous local authorities, replacing the civil parish of Deane as the main unit of local administration, although the ecclesiastical parish still remained under the authority of the vicar of Deane.

In 1837, Rumworth along with neighbouring townships (or civil parishes) became part of the Bolton Poor Law Union which took responsibility for the administration and funding of the Poor Law in that area. In the 19th century many of the Deane townships became independent civil parishes and were merged into the Municipal Borough of Bolton or formed they own urban districts. In 1872, part of Rumworth township became part of Bolton Municipal Borough, the remainder of Rumworth (which included Deane Parish Church) was renamed Deane township in 1894 and became part of the Bolton Rural District, but in 1898 it too was merged into the County Borough of Bolton.

Geography

References
Notes

Bibliography

External links
Deane C.of E. Parish
GENUKI - Deane
Virtual Drive around Deane
A Vision of Britain - Deane
BBC History Trail - Deane
Heatons of Deane

Areas of Bolton
Former civil parishes in Greater Manchester